Kleindietwil railway station is a railway station in the municipality of Madiswil, in the Swiss canton of Bern. It is an intermediate stop on the standard gauge Langenthal–Huttwil line of BLS AG.

Services 
The following services stop at Kleindietwil:

References

External links 
 
 

Railway stations in the canton of Bern
BLS railway stations